Anne-Laure Klein (born 14 November 1983) is a French rhythmic gymnast. She represented France at the Olympic Games in 2000

Career 
Integrating the group in 1999, in 2000 Klein was part of the French group that competed at the Olympic Games held in Sydney, Australia. They scored 37.900 points in the qualifying round with teammates Anna-Sofie Doyen, Anne-Sophie Lavoine, Magalie Poisson, Laetitia Mancieri and Vanessa Sauzede. They finished in ninth place after qualification, not managing to reach the final.

References

1983 births
Living people
French rhythmic gymnasts
Olympic gymnasts of France
Gymnasts at the 2000 Summer Olympics